Code Name: Diamond Head is a 1977 American spy film starring Roy Thinnes as an undercover counterintelligence officer known as Diamond Head whose mission is to stop a rogue double agent from stealing the formula for a new chemical weapon. Originally filmed as a pilot for a new television drama (which was never picked up by the networks), it was eventually used for The NBC Monday Movie on U.S. broadcast network NBC.

Plot
Johnny Paul (Thinnes) is a flashy gambler and ladies' man living on Oahu. In reality, he is an agent working for a secret US government agency.  He is assigned to a mission to stop the theft of a deadly new gas, which has the potential to cause instant death upon contact. The substance was being secretly created by a top battalion of Marines at the request of a Pentagon official. However, a double agent had infiltrated the unit, killed the executive, and assumed his identity. Paul uses his image to get close to the double agent, who is known by the pseudonym "Tree". However, once his cover is blown, it's a race against time to stop Tree from selling the secrets to an unnamed foreign power.

Cast
 Roy Thinnes as Johnny Paul / "Diamond Head"
 France Nuyen as Tso-Tsing
 Gilbert Lani Kauhi as Zulu
 Ward Costello as Captain Macintosh
 Don Knight as H.K. Muldoon 
 Ian McShane as Sean Donovan / "Tree"
 Eric Braeden as Ernest Graeber
 Dennis Patrick as Commander Yarnell
 Alex Henteloff as Dr. Edward Sherman
 Eric Christmas as Father Murphy

Reception and legacy
The film was featured in a season six episode of Mystery Science Theater 3000.

Home media
The film is currently available only in VHS format. The Mystery Science Theater version was released in DVD format on March 27, 2012 as part of the 23rd boxset of the series.

References

External links

AllMovie
Excerpt of MST3K treatment on Shout Factory's official YouTube channel

1977 films
1977 television films
1977 drama films
1970s English-language films
Films directed by Jeannot Szwarc
Films set in Hawaii
American drama television films
1970s American films